Sleep, or Forever Hold Your Piece was the fifth full-length LP by Sleep Chamber. The lineup on this recording was John Zewizz, Arthur PW, Jonathan Briley, Eugene Difrancisco, Lawrence Van Horn, Tione, Ashley Swanson, and Dan Walker.

While the release is predominantly industrial/techno, each song is separated by a nine-part ambient piece titled "Verbum Sapienti 1-9". It was recorded at Waltz Studio except "The Light Pours Out ov Me" (originally written and released by Magazine as "The Light Pours Out of Me") recorded at Newbury, and "Babylon" recorded live at Manray, Boston, on 31 December 1990.

The album was pressed in the US by Inner-X-Musick on cassette (without a catalog number), and two LP versions XXX-LP-11/ XXX-LP-11-DJ (white label promo LP). It was released as a CD on Fünfundvierzig, catalog number Fünfundvierzig 51.

Track listing
 El Topo  – 6:01
  Romance – 4:12
 Snakebite – 5:25
 The Light Pours Out ov Me – 4:31
 Way ov The Flesh  – 3:48
 Babylon - 6:40
 A Better Way  - 5:25
 A Synthetic Woman - 4:56
 Dominatrix - 4:48
 Mrs. Goodbar - 5:39
 Skulduggery  - 5:05

References
http://www.discogs.com/Sleep-Chamber-Sleep-Or-Forever-Hold-Your-Piece/master/27166
https://web.archive.org/web/20101113061114/http://www.freewebs.com/theebradmiller/sleeporforeverholdy.htm

1990 albums